Grindelia chiloensis, the shrubby gumweed, is a species of flowering plant in the family Asteraceae, native to central and southern Chile, and Argentina. A perennial shrub adapted to arid areas, its dried leaves can contain up to 25% resin, so efforts are being made to bring into cultivation for resin and biomass production.

References

chiloensis
Flora of central Chile
Flora of southern Chile
Flora of Northwest Argentina
Flora of Northeast Argentina
Flora of South Argentina
Plants described in 1931